The 1958 Colorado Buffaloes football team was an American football team that represented the University of Colorado in the Big Seven Conference during the 1958 NCAA University Division football season. Led by 11th-year head coach Dallas Ward, the Buffaloes compiled an overall record of 6–4 with a mark of 4–2 in conference play, placing third in the Big 7. The team played its home games on campus at Folsom Field in Boulder, Colorado.

Colorado opened with five wins, but then dropped four of five, including intrastate losses at home to Colorado State and Air Force to conclude the season. Ward was fired by the university regents in January, and stayed at CU as a professor of physical education. He was succeeded in February by Sonny Grandelius, an assistant at Michigan State under Duffy Daugherty.

Schedule

Coaching staff
Assistant coaches: Marshall Wells, Frank Prentup, Jack Nelson, Will Walls

References

External links
 Sports-Reference – 1958 Colorado Buffaloes

Colorado
Colorado Buffaloes football seasons
Colorado Buffaloes football